The  Mary W. Somers  is a Chesapeake Bay skipjack, built in 1904 at Mearsville, Virginia. She is a  two-sail bateau, or "V"-bottomed deadrise type of centerboard sloop.  She is one of the 35 surviving traditional Chesapeake Bay skipjacks and a member of the last commercial sailing fleet in the United States. She is located at St. Marys City, St. Mary's County, Maryland.

She was listed on the National Register of Historic Places in 1976.

References

External links
MARY W. SOMERS (skipjack), St. Mary's County, including photo in 1984, at Maryland Historical Trust

St. Mary's County, Maryland
Skipjacks
Ships on the National Register of Historic Places in Maryland
1904 ships
National Register of Historic Places in St. Mary's County, Maryland